American pop rock group Boys Like Girls has released three studio albums, one live album, three extended plays, and seven singles.

After forming in 2005, the band signed with Columbia Records the following year and released their debut single, "Hero/Heroine", which initially failed to chart. The song was included on their self-titled debut album, which was released in August 2006. Following the top 40 success of its second single, "The Great Escape", the group re-released "Hero/Heroine" and the album reached a new peak position of 55 on the Billboard 200. Boys Like Girls was eventually certified Gold by the Recording Industry Association of America (RIAA) in 2008. A third single, "Thunder", was released in 2008 to moderate chart success. All three singles were also certified Gold by RIAA, with "The Great Escape" later going Platinum.

Their second album, Love Drunk, was released on September 8, 2009. Fuelled by the success of its title track and lead single, the album debuted at #8 on the Billboard 200 and at #1 on the Billboard Top Rock Albums chart. The group earned its highest-charting single to date with "Two Is Better Than One", a collaboration with American country pop artist Taylor Swift that served as the record's second single. Both singles received Platinum certifications from RIAA. The group also experience success in Canada with Love Drunk, as the album charted at number 11 on the Canadian Albums Chart and its first two singles reached the top 40 on the Canadian Hot 100. "Heart Heart Heartbreak" was released in 2010 as the album's third single and became the group's first release to miss the Hot 100. 

In 2012, the group released their third studio album, Crazy World. The album was a commercial disappointment for the band, reaching number 134 on the Billboard 200 and producing only one single, the non-charting "Be Your Everything".

Albums

Studio albums

Extended plays

Singles

Promotional singles

Videography

Video releases

Music videos

Notes

References 

Pop music group discographies
Punk rock group discographies
Discographies of American artists